USS Wateree may refer to the following ships of the United States Navy:

, was a gunboat launched in 1863. She was badly damaged in an earthquake in Arica, Peru
, was a fleet ocean tug, launched in June 1944 and sunk in November 1945
, was an auxiliary ocean tug launched in 1943, sold to the Peruvian Navy in 1961, and served there until 1977 or 1978

United States Navy ship names